Little Sandhurst is a suburb of Sandhurst in Berkshire, England, and part of the civil parish of Sandhurst.

Geography
Little Sandhurst has a Site of Special Scientific Interest just to the east of the suburb, called Sandhurst to Owlsmoor Bogs and Heaths, which includes a nature reserve called Wildmoor Heath.

The suburb also is next to two more local nature reserves one called Ambarrow Court and the other Edgbarrow Woods, which is on the grounds of Wellington College.

Public houses 
Bird in Hand, The

Schools 
New Scotland Hill School

References

Sandhurst, Berkshire